Brian Jeffrey Giles (born April 27, 1960) is a former Major League Baseball player. Drafted in the third round of the 1978 Major League Baseball Draft by the New York Mets, Giles reached the major leagues in 1981 and played for the Mets until 1983. In 1984, he was drafted by the Milwaukee Brewers in the rule 5 draft. He played 34 games with the Brewers in 1985 before signing with the Chicago White Sox as a free agent. He played only 9 games for the White Sox, and would not reappear in the Majors until a brief 45-game stint with the Seattle Mariners in 1990. He played his last game with the Mariners on July 7, 1990. Giles played primarily second base and shortstop.

Giles' grandfather, George Giles, was an All-Star first baseman for the Kansas City Monarchs of the Negro National League in the late 1920s.

References

External links
, or Retrosheet, or Pura Pelota (Venezuelan Winter League)

1960 births
Living people
African-American baseball players
American expatriate baseball players in Canada
American expatriate baseball players in Mexico
Atlantic City Surf players
Baseball players from Kansas
Buffalo Bisons (minor league) players
Calgary Cannons players
Chicago White Sox players
Colorado Springs Sky Sox players
Hawaii Islanders players
Jackson Mets players
Little Falls Mets players
Lynchburg Mets players
Major League Baseball second basemen
Major League Baseball shortstops
Milwaukee Brewers players
Minot Mallards players
New York Mets players
Newark Bears players
Olmecas de Tabasco players
Petroleros de Poza Rica players
Saskatoon Smokin' Guns players
Seattle Mariners players
Sportspeople from Manhattan, Kansas
Tiburones de La Guaira players
American expatriate baseball players in Venezuela
Tidewater Tides players
Vancouver Canadians players
West Manitoba Wranglers players
American expatriate baseball players in Italy
21st-century African-American people
20th-century African-American sportspeople
Kearny High School (California) alumni